John Kenneth Mozley (8 January 1883 – 23 November 1946), also known as J. K. Mozley, was an English Anglican priest, theologian, and academic. Among other appointments, he was a Fellow and later Dean of Pembroke College, Cambridge from 1909 to 1919, the Principal of the Leeds Clergy School from 1920 to 1925, lecturer of Leeds Parish Church from 1920 to 1930 and 1945 to 1946, and Canon Chancellor of St Paul's Cathedral from 1930 to 1941.

Selected works

References

External links
 

1883 births
1946 deaths
20th-century English Anglican priests
Presidents of the Cambridge Union
20th-century English theologians
English Anglican theologians
Fellows of Pembroke College, Cambridge
Chancellors of St Paul's Cathedral
Place of birth missing
Place of death missing